The men's shot put event at the 1984 Summer Olympics in Los Angeles, United States had an entry list of 19 competitors from 13 nations. The maximum number of athletes per nation had been set at 3 since the 1930 Olympic Congress. The final was held on August 11, 1984. The event was won by Alessandro Andrei of Italy, the nation's first medal in the men's shot put. Michael Carter and Dave Laut of the United States took silver and bronze, respectively, putting Americans back on the podium for the first time since 1972.

Background

This was the 20th appearance of the event, which is one of 12 athletics events to have been held at every Summer Olympics. None of the finalists from the 1980 Games returned. The absence of the East German, Soviet, and Polish teams had a significant impact: world record holder Udo Beyer, defending Olympic champion Vladimir Kiselyov, and inaugural World Champion Edward Sarul were all from boycotting countries.

Chile, Egypt, the Netherlands, and Samoa each made their debut in the men's shot put. The United States made its 19th appearance, most of any nation, having missed only the boycotted 1980 Games.

Competition format

The competition used the two-round format introduced in 1936, with the qualifying round completely separate from the divided final. In qualifying, each athlete received three attempts; those recording a mark of at least 19.70 metres advanced to the final. If fewer than 12 athletes achieved that distance, the top 12 would advance. The results of the qualifying round were then ignored. Finalists received three throws each, with the top eight competitors receiving an additional three attempts. The best distance among those six throws counted.

Records

The standing world and Olympic records prior to the 1984 Games were as follows.

No new world or Olympic records were set during the competition.

Schedule

All times are Pacific Daylight Time (UTC-7)

Results

Qualification

Top 12 and ties and all those reaching 19.70 metres advanced to the final

Final

See also
 1982 Men's European Championships Shot Put (Athens)
 1983 Men's World Championships Shot Put (Helsinki)
 1984 Men's Friendship Games Shot Put (Moscow)
 1986 Men's European Championships Shot Put (Stuttgart)
 1987 Men's World Championships Shot Put (Rome)

References

External links
 Results

S
Shot put at the Olympics
Men's events at the 1984 Summer Olympics